Yevgeniy Semenchuk (born 22 June 2001) is a Belarusian professional footballer.

References

External links 
 
 

2001 births
Living people
Belarusian footballers
Association football defenders
FC Dinamo Minsk players
FC Sputnik Rechitsa players